Constitutional Democratic Party may refer to:

Constitutional Democratic Party, Russia
Constitutional Democratic Party (Italy)
Constitutional Democratic Party (Japan), political party from 1927 to 1940
Constitutional Democratic Party of Japan, political party since 2017
Constitutional Democratic Party (Ukraine)
Constitutional Democratic Party – Party of Popular Freedom

See also
Democratic Constitutional Rally, Tunisia